Nakkaş Osman (sometimes called Osman the Miniaturist) was the chief miniaturist for the Ottoman Empire during the later half of the sixteenth century. The dates of his birth and death are poorly known, but most of his works are dated to the last quarter of the sixteenth century.

The oldest known illustrations of Nakkaş Osman's were made between 1560 and 1570 for a Turkish translation of the epic Persian poem Shahnama by Ferdowsi. He is known to have been the chief illustrator of the various official histories written by Seyyid Lokman for Murad III that were produced in this era, including the Zafername (Book of Victories), the Şahname-ı Selim Han (Book of Kings of Selim Khan).  and the Şehinşahname (Book of King of Kings). In 1582 he worked on the astrological Book of Felicity, and around 1585 he was one of the illustrators of the Siyer-i Nebi, an epic on the life of Muhammad written around 1388.

Style
Osman's illustrative style has been described as "plain, yet perceptive". His illustrations show careful attention to the most minute detail, depicting events in a realistic style.

Osman's portraits tend to display more emotion than those of previous court artists. The tale of Rostam and Sohrab, for example, had heretofore always been represented the same way, with peripheral characters who appear "distant, detached, and still, [and who] scarcely display any trace of facial or bodily expression", whereas in Osman's version Sohrab's groom looks to be "collapsing with grief and shock" as he witnesses Rostam killing his own son.

His work influenced the next generation of court painters in the Ottoman Empire, with the important works of this era derived from his style.

Literature
Nobel Prize-winner Orhan Pamuk's novel My Name Is Red is a fictional account of Osman and his workshop. In the story, Osman blinds himself with a needle, emulating the blindness of the legendary miniaturist Bihzad. In the novel his dying represents "the end of the Ottoman miniature" because after him, the miniaturists follow the art of the West.

Miniatures

Notes

References

External links
Miniatures from the Şahname-ı Selim Han
Miniatures from the Şehinşahname
Complete miniatures from the Hünername

16th-century people from the Ottoman Empire
Miniaturists from the Ottoman Empire
16th-century artists from the Ottoman Empire